Harold Murphy (April 1, 1938 – January 5, 2015) was an American politician.

Born in Birmingham, Alabama, Murphy served in the United States Army reserves. He received his bachelor's degree in education from Northeastern Illinois University and then worked in the office of the Illinois Secretary of State. He served on the Markham, Illinois City Council, the school board, and the Markham Park District. He was a Democrat. From 1993 to 2002, Murphy served in the Illinois House of Representatives.

Notes

1938 births
2015 deaths
Politicians from Birmingham, Alabama
People from Markham, Illinois
Northeastern Illinois University alumni
Illinois city council members
School board members in Illinois
Democratic Party members of the Illinois House of Representatives